Militza Castro Morales (born March 13, 1976) is a retired female track and field athlete, who competed in the sprints events during her career.

She represented her native country at the 2000 Summer Olympics, where she was eliminated in the first round of the women's 4x400 metres relay competition, alongside Sandra Moya, Beatriz Cruz and Maritza Salas. Castro ran the first leg in the heat 2 race.

International competitions

References

1976 births
Living people
Puerto Rican female sprinters
Athletes (track and field) at the 2000 Summer Olympics
Olympic track and field athletes of Puerto Rico
Pan American Games competitors for Puerto Rico
Athletes (track and field) at the 2003 Pan American Games
Central American and Caribbean Games silver medalists for Puerto Rico
Competitors at the 2002 Central American and Caribbean Games
Competitors at the 2006 Central American and Caribbean Games
Central American and Caribbean Games medalists in athletics